The JVC GR-C1 was a camcorder released in March 1984 by JVC and was notable as the first all-in-one VHS-C camcorder, as opposed to earlier portable systems in which the camera and recorder were separate units linked by a cable.

It used a 30-minute VHS-C video tape, which could be played back in a standard VHS VCR using an adapter. The camera was also capable of playback in the viewfinder or through a composite video cable. A separate RF modulator was available to enable connection to the aerial socket of domestic televisions. By comparison, the camera's nearest competitor at the time, Sony's Betamovie, could record but not play back. JVC invented the VHS format and released the first VCR of that type, the JVC HR-3300, in 1976.

Unlike later CCD-based camcorders, the GR-C1 uses a 1/2" Saticon pickup tube.

It was also released under license and in a black finish by German company Telefunken as the 890 Movie and in a dark red by German company SABA as the VM 6700.

The GR-C1 was voted one of the top 100 gadgets of all time.

In popular culture

The JVC GR-C1 was famous as Doc Brown's video camera (operated by Marty McFly) in the film Back to the Future.

It also featured in Stranger Things season 2 (set in 1984), as the camcorder Bob Newby hands over to Jonathan Byers to use when he takes Will and the other kids trick-or-treating and is used to record the Mind Flayer.

The JVC GR-C1 was the subject of an episode of Marques Brownlee's YouTube Originals series 'Retro Tech'.

It's shown in S7E13 of The Goldbergs titled: "Geoff the Pleaser". The "other" Adam Goldberg places it on the display towards the end of the episode.

References

External links
 JVC GR-C1 page at the Total Rewind website
 

GR-C1